Ibana is a genus of spiders in the family Thomisidae. It was first described in 2014. , it contains only two species, Ibana gan, found in China and  Ibana senagang, found in Borneo.

Species
 it contains two species, found in Asia: 
Ibana gan (Liu & S. Q. Li, 2022) – China
Ibana senagang (Benjamin, 2014) – Borneo

References

Thomisidae
Monotypic Araneomorphae genera
Spiders of Oceania
Taxa described in 2014